Yes, Virginia may refer to:

Yes, Virginia, there is a Santa Claus, a phrase from an 1897 editorial called Is There a Santa Claus?
Yes, Virginia..., 2006 album by American band The Dresden Dolls
Yes, Virginia (TV program), Christmas television special that first aired in 2009